Astrothelium laevithallinum is a species of corticolous (bark-dwelling), crustose lichen in the family Trypetheliaceae. Found in Brazil, it was formally described as a new species in 2016 by Robert Lücking, Matthew Nelsen, and Marcelo Marcelli. The species epithet laevithallinum alludes to the contrast between its smooth thallus and the  thallus of its phylogenetically distinct but close relative, Astrothelium endochryseum. The characteristic of the lichen that distinguishes A. laevithallinum from others in genus Astrothelium is the smooth thallus.

References

laevithallinum
Lichen species
Lichens described in 2016
Taxa named by Robert Lücking
Lichens of Brazil